Dame Evelyn Emily Marian Fox, DBE (1874–1955) was a noted British health worker, specializing in mental health and epilepsy. She studied history at Somerville College, Oxford.

Fox, who was General Secretary of the National Association for Mental Health (NAMH – now known as MIND) in the late 1940s, along with Tyler Fox (no relation), Medical Director of the Epilepsy Colony at Lingfield, Surrey and Irene Gairdner, a social science graduate from the London School of Economics, were the driving forces for the creation of the British Epilepsy Association (BEA).

Legacy
Dame Evelyn Fox School, Blackburn is named in her honour. The school closed in 2000.

References

External links

Alumni of Somerville College, Oxford
English health activists
Dames Commander of the Order of the British Empire
1874 births
1955 deaths
Place of birth missing
Place of death missing